Dragoneutes obscurus is a species of beetle in the family Cerambycidae. It was described by Félix Édouard Guérin-Méneville in 1843.

References

Torneutini
Beetles described in 1843